Keltie is the surname of:
 Clark Keltie (born 1983), English footballer
 John Scott Keltie (1840–1927), Scottish geographer
 Kate Keltie (born 1986), Australian actress

It is the given name of:
 Keltie Duggan (born 1970), Canadian swimmer
 Keltie Hansen (born 1992), Canadian freestyle skier

See also:
 Keltie Glacier
 Keltie Head
 Kelty